The Global Methodist Church (shortened to GM Church, or GMC) is a Methodist denomination of Protestant Christianity subscribing to views consistent with the conservative Confessing Movement. The denomination is headquartered in the United States and has a presence internationally.

The Global Methodist Church was created as a result of a schism with The United Methodist Church, after members departed to erect a denomination seeking to uphold historic Methodist praxis. Its doctrines, which are aligned with Wesleyan-Arminian theology, are contained in the Transitional Book of Doctrines and Discipline, its Book of Discipline, and in The Catechism of the Global Methodist Church. , the church says it is composed of 1,100 congregations and 1,200 clergy members.

History

In the United Methodist Church, polarization started to occur between traditionalist Methodist theologians and clerics and those with progressive tendencies. Traditionalist caucuses within the United Methodist Church, such as the Confessing Movement within The United Methodist Church, Good News, Concerned Methodists, Transforming Congregations, UM Action, Lifewatch, and the Institute on Religion and Democracy for a number of years, promoted what they saw as historic Methodist positions in various General Conferences, Annual Conferences, districts, and local churches. The United Methodist Church, spurred by its global growth, was moving "in a more traditionalist and orthodox direction" as a whole. Every General Conference of the United Methodist Church since 1972 continued to uphold a traditionalist stance on human sexuality and in the United Methodist 2016 General Conference, the Church adopted more pro-life stances with respect to abortion.

In 2016, at the United Methodist Church's General Conference in Portland, Oregon, delegates voted 428 to 405 to delay conversation on homosexuality and proposed a review of ecclesiastical restrictions, with the Book of Discipline's injunctions remaining in effect, that "homosexuality is incompatible with Christian teaching" and that "marriage is only between a man and a woman." Despite the UMC prohibiting the ordination of self-avowed practicing' gay clergy" in its Book of Discipline, one Filipino and more than a hundred progressive American clergy in attendance at the General Conference came out as gay.

Two major plans regarding the UMC's position on homosexuality were suggested at the 2019 General Conference in St. Louis, Missouri: the Traditional Plan, which supported the denomination's current stance against same-sex marriage, and the One Church Plan, which called for the loosening of restrictions. Supporters of the Traditional Plan (who were aligned with the traditionalist caucuses), citing the Book of Discipline, succeeded in passing their proposal with a delegate vote of 438 to 384. Prior to the April vote, discussion of possible schisms over gay issues had grown following a February special session that recommended the Traditional Plan. In late 2020, two progressively-aligned UMC-originating groups announced their establishment: Liberation Methodist Connexion and The Liberation Project.

Despite the passing of the Traditional Plan in the 2019 General Conference of the United Methodist Church, several modernist United Methodist clergy announced a refusal to adhere to it and the United Methodist Book of Discipline. As a result, the traditionalist caucuses began to plan the formal erection of a new traditionalist Methodist denomination, the Global Methodist Church. The denomination's name was chosen in the spirit of a quote from the father of Methodism, John Wesley, who stated with regard to evangelism, that "The world is my parish."

Due to the COVID-19 pandemic, plans to discuss and formalize the Global Methodist schism, including that of the Global Methodist Church, were delayed until 2022. In August and September of that year, the UMC General Conference is expected to vote on the proposal referred to as the "Protocol of Reconciliation and Grace Through Separation". However, Reverend Keith Boyette, chairman of the Transitional Leadership Council of the Global Methodist Church, published a letter in January 2022 that expressed concern this General Conference would also be delayed. In February 2022, the UMC announced that it was examining again postponing the General Conference. Not wanting to wait for the General Conference to occur, some conservative United Methodist congregations left the United Methodist Church to become a part of the Free Methodist Church, a traditionalist Methodist denomination. 

The denomination launched on May 1, 2022. On 6-7 May 2022, leaders and delegates of the Wesleyan Covenant Association met in Avon, Indiana. They selected Jay Therrell of Florida as their leader, replacing Keith Boyette of Virginia, who will remain in as a member of the GMC's leadership. Also, they approved core beliefs and policies for the denomination. In September, a group of UMC bishops in Africa suspended cooperation with the Africa Initiative and Wesleyan Covenant Association after accusing the groups of working "to destroy our United Methodist Church" and attempting to raise the Global Methodist Church's profile.

Beliefs 

The doctrines of the Global Methodist Church, which are aligned with Wesleyan-Arminian theology, are contained in its Book of Discipline and in The Catechism of the Global Methodist Church.

Organization 
Much like both the UMC and FMC, the GMC will have an episcopacy that will oversee annual conferences. Unlike the UMC, bishops within the GMC will be consecrated to serve for a set term, as opposed to a lifetime role. The role within the UMC of district superintendent will be replaced with that of a presiding elder.

In May 2022, the Judicial Council of the United Methodist Church ruled that none of the 51 annual conferences in the United States can leave the church for the GMC and that only individual churches can do so. However, the ruling does not apply to conferences outside the United States. The Romania-Bulgaria Conference had already voted to leave the UMC, and in June the Evangelical Methodist Church in Croatia joined as a member church of the GMC.

See also

 Wesleyan-holiness movement
 Congregational Methodist Church
 Wesleyan Church

References

External links
Global Methodist Church, official website
Wesleyan Covenant Association, associated pre-foundation body

Methodist denominations
United Methodist Church
Methodist denominations in North America
Methodist denominations established in the 21st century